The Duchy or Ducatus is the denomination for territories occasionally governed separately by members (dukes) of the Árpád dynasty within the Kingdom of Hungary in the 11th-12th centuries. The symbol of the ducal power was a sword, while the royal power was represented by the crown.

Origins
Modern historians do not share a consensual view on the origins of the Duchy or territorial units administered by members of the royal family within the medieval Kingdom of Hungary. György Györffy writes that the Ducatus or "Duchy" developed from the command over the Kabars and other ethnic groups which joined the federation of the Hungarian tribes. According to his opinion, this command was initially, even before the Hungarian conquest of the Carpathian Basin around 895, bestowed upon the heir to the supreme head of the Hungarian tribal federation, in accordance with the customs of the Turkic peoples of the Eurasian steppes. Therefore, Györffy continues, the crown prince's command over these ethnic groups transformed, in the course of the 10th century, into his authority over the territories where they settled. Tringli says that it is possible that Koppány's domains in Transdanubia and Saint Emeric's territories (he bore the title of Duke of Russians) were duchies too in accordance with steppe tradition. On the other hand, Gyula Kristó, who rejected Györffy's theory, writes that the Duchy only came into being when King Andrew I of Hungary granted one third of his kingdom to his younger brother, Béla around 1048. He cites the Illuminated Chronicle which clearly states that this was the "first division of the kingdom".

Clifford Rogers argues that possession of the Duchy owes its roots to the tradition of senioratus. The dukes regarded the control of the duchy as a pathway to the throne.

Territories

The exact borders of the Duchy have not been determined yet. The counties entrusted to the members of the ruling dynasty did not form a separate province within the kingdom, but they were organized around two or three centers. The duchy made up one-third of the kingdom's territory.

The eastern block of the counties were located around Bihar, a city that was also the see of a Roman Catholic diocese in that time. The north-western parts of the territories were centered around Nyitra. A third possible center of the territories was Krassó, a fortress destroyed later in the first half of the 13th century, located near to the present-day Dupljaja in Serbia.

The dukes' principal hunting-grounds lay in the "Holy Forest" (Igyfon) on the territory of the Apuseni Mountains (today in Romania) in the 11th century.

History
The practise of dynastical divisions of the kingdom's territories commenced in 1048 when King Andrew I of Hungary conceded one-third of the counties of his kingdom in appanage to his brother, Béla. At that time, Duke Béla was the heir presumptive, but later King Andrew I fathered a son, Solomon. The birth of Solomon gave rise to conflicts between the two brothers that resulted in a civil war. The civil war stopped in 1060 when Béla defeated his brother and ascended the throne.

When Béla died in 1063, his sons Géza, Ladislaus and Lampert had to flee from the Kingdom of Hungary, because their cousin, Solomon (who had already been crowned in 1057) returned followed by the troops his brother-in-law, King Henry IV of Germany provided him. Shortly afterwards, King Bolesław II of Poland provided military assistance to the three dukes thus they could return to the kingdom. However, the parties wanted to avoid the emerging civil war and therefore they made an agreement on 20 January 1064 in Győr. Under the agreement, the three brothers, Dukes Géza, Ladislaus and Lampert accepted the rule of their cousin, King Solomon who conceded them their father's former duchy (the Ducatus).

Following a nine-year-long period of cooperation, conflicts arose among the king and the dukes, and the latter could expand their power over the larger part of the kingdom and the king had to flee to the western borders. In 1074, the eldest duke, Géza was proclaimed king, while King Solomon could maintain his rule only in some western counties of the kingdom. Following his ascension to the throne, King Géza confirmed his brothers, Ladislaus and Lampert in the possession of the Duchy. When Géza died on 25 April 1077, his partisans proclaimed Ladislaus king who could enforce King Solomon to accept his rule in 1081. During Ladislaus' reign, the Duchy may have governed by his brother, Duke Lampert, but it has not been proven, yet.

The Ducatus ("Tercia pars regni") revived in 1095–1096, when King Coloman of Hungary made and agreement with his brother, Álmos, who had been debating Coloman's right to the throne following the death of King Ladislaus I, and conceded the territories in appanage to him. In 1105, Duke Álmos rebelled against his brother and sought for military assistance from the Holy Roman Empire and Poland, but his troops were defeated by the king shortly afterwards. In 1107, Duke Álmos made a pilgrimage to the Holy Land, and taking advantage of his absence, King Coloman occupied the territories of the Duchy. 

When Duke Álmos returned from the Holy Land and realised that his territories had been incorporated into the royal domains, he escaped to the court of Henry V, Holy Roman Emperor. Upon the duke's request, the Emperor laid siege to Posonium. However, King Coloman sought the assistance of Duke Bolesław III of Poland, who attacked Bohemia. In November, the emperor made a peace with Coloman, who let his brother come back to his court, but the duchy of Álmos and his ducal power was not to be restored. Shortly afterwards, Coloman set up the bishopric of Nitra in one of the seats of the Dcuatus.

The last revival of the Duchy occurred in 1162, when King Ladislaus II of Hungary, who had been proclaimed king under the menaces of the Byzantine Emperor Manuel I Komnenos against his nephew, King Stephen III, granted its territories to his brother, Stephen following his coronation on 25 December 1162. When King Ladislaus II died in three weeks (on 14 January 1163), Duke Stephen was proclaimed king (and, in some months, he was defeated by King Stephen III) and therefore the territories of his former duchy were incorporated into the royal domains definitely.

During the 13-14th centuries, members of the royal dynasties received some provinces (e.g., Slavonia, Transylvania) of the kingdom in appanage and the was never re-established.

Dukes
The list of the members of the Árpád dynasty who were dukes of the Ducatus ("Tercia pars regni") follows:
 Béla the Champion / the Bison (1048–1060)
 Géza (1064–1074)
 Saint Ladislaus (1064–1077)
 Lampert (1064- cca. 1095)
 Álmos (1095/1096-1107)
 Stephen (1162–1163)

See also
Principality of Nitra

Sources

Sources

 

The Hungarian Illuminated Chronicle: Chronica de Gestis Hungarorum (Edited by Dezső Dercsényi) (1970). Corvina, Taplinger Publishing. .

Medieval Kingdom of Hungary
Transylvania in the Kingdom of Hungary
Slovakia in the Kingdom of Hungary
Historical regions in the Kingdom of Hungary
Dukes
Dukes